Enric Masip Borrás (born September 1, 1969 in Barcelona) is a retired Spanish handball player. He is considered one of the best Spanish handball players ever.

Formed in the younger categories of BM Granollers, in 1987 begun to play with the first team. After his good matches, in 1990 joined the FC Barcelona, winning 6 European Cups and 7 Leagues.

As a member of the Spanish national handball team, he participated in two Summer Olympics, six World Championships and three European Championships, serving as team captain in 2003. After some years with a lot of back injuries, he retired in 2004.

Teams playing
 BM Granollers 1987-1990
 FC Barcelona Handbol 1990-2004

Honours
National team
 Bronze medal in the Olympic Games Sydney 2000
 Silver medal in the European Championship Spain 1996
 Bronze medal in the European Championship Croatia 2000
 Silver medal in the Junior World Championship in Spain 1989
FC Barcelona
 European Cup: 6 (1990–91, 1995–96, 1996–97, 1997–98, 1998–99, 1999–00)
 European Cup Winners' Cup: 2 (1993–94, 1994–95)
 European Super Cup: 4 (1996–97, 1997–98, 1998–99, 1999-00)
 Liga ASOBAL: 7 (1990–91, 1991–92, 1995–96, 1996–97, 1997–98, 1998–99, 1999–00)
 King's Cup: 5 (1992–93, 1993–94, 1996–97, 1997–98, 1999–00)
 ASOBAL Cup: 5 (1994–95, 1995–96, 1999–00, 2000–01, 2001–02)
 Spanish Supercup: 5 (1990–91, 1991–92, 1993–94, 1996–97, 1997–98)
 Catalan league: 8 (1987–88, 1988–89, 1990–91, 1991–92, 1992–93, 1993–94, 1994–95, 1996–97)
 Pirenees League: 5 (1997, 1998, 1999, 2000, 2001)

Notes

References

External links
 
 
 
 
 

1969 births
Living people
Handball players from Catalonia
Spanish male handball players
Liga ASOBAL players
Olympic medalists in handball
BM Granollers players
FC Barcelona Handbol players
Olympic handball players of Spain
Olympic bronze medalists for Spain
Handball players at the 1992 Summer Olympics
Handball players at the 2000 Summer Olympics
Medalists at the 2000 Summer Olympics